ROKS Cheonan is the name of two South Korean Navy warships:

Republic of Korea Navy ship names